The 1999 Westel 900 Budapest Open doubles was the doubles event of the second edition of the Budapest Grand Prix; a WTA Tier IV tournament and the most prestigious women's tennis tournament held in Hungary. Virginia Ruano Pascual and Paola Suárez were the defending champions but only Ruano Pascual competed that year with Laura Montalvo.

Montalvo and Ruano Pascual lost in the final 6–3, 6–4 against Evgenia Kulikovskaya and Sandra Naćuk.

Seeds
The top two seeded teams received byes into the quarterfinals.

Draw

External links
 1999 Westel 900 Budapest Open Doubles Draw

Budapest Grand Prix
Westel 900 Budapest Open